Rockie Lynn Rash (born November 14, 1964) is an American country music artist, known professionally as Rockie Lynne. He was signed to Universal South Records in late 2005, releasing his self-titled debut album in early 2006. This album produced three singles on the Billboard Hot Country Songs charts, including the No. 29-peaking "Lipstick". After exiting Universal South's roster in 2007, he signed to Robbins Nashville, where in 2008 he charted his fourth single, "I Can't Believe It's Me".

Biography
Rockie Lynne Rash was adopted in Statesville, North Carolina. His family was composed of Southern Baptists. At age twelve, Lynne bought a guitar from his uncle, as well as a record player and records from Jimi Hendrix and Kiss, which he listened to in the closet. He later played at the jazz ensemble in his high school and went on to perform in local bands.

He later enlisted in the United States Army, and served as a paratrooper in the 82nd Airborne Division while stationed in Fort Bragg in North Carolina. After ending his term in the Army, Lynne attended the Guitar Institute of Technology on the GI bill, before moving to Myrtle Beach, South Carolina, where he worked with a local musician named Mike Shane. He followed Shane to Nashville, Tennessee, in the early 1990s, where he worked as a backing musician for The McCarters and Merle Haggard's son, Noel Haggard. Wanting to perform his own music, Lynne began recording on his own, issuing his own material and eventually moving to Coon Rapids, Minnesota. Later he moved back to Nashville and started a new musical career. He was eventually discovered by a representative of Warner Music Group, who recommended him to Universal South Records.

Musical career
He signed to Universal South Records in 2005, releasing his debut single "Lipstick" late that year under the name Rockie Lynne. This song became his first chart single, reaching as high as No. 29 on the Billboard country singles charts. It was the first single from his self-titled debut album, which was released in May 2006 via Universal South. The album's other two singles — "Do We Still" and "More" — both missed the Top 40, peaking at No. 46 and No. 48 respectively, and he exited the label by 2007. An independent album, Twilight, followed in February 2007.

He has made 14 appearances on the stage of the Grand Ole Opry.

In late 2007, he became the first artist signed to Robbins Nashville, a newly established independent label founded by New York City-based Robbins Entertainment. He charted for the fourth time with the No. 49 "I Can't Believe It's Me" in 2008.

As a veteran of the United States Army, he is often requested to perform for patriotic and military events and his original songs are regularly licensed for use in conjunction with veteran and patriotic-themed programming.

He is the founder of a national charitable organization founded in Minnesota, Tribute to the Troops, now in its 11th year.  The organization has four chapters: Minnesota, Illinois, Oregon, North Carolina.  This 501c3 has raised over 300,000 for a college fund designed to provide tuition for children who have lost a parent in active duty.

His original compositions have been included in regional and national network programs, of which highlights include an Emmy Award-winning program produced by Wisconsin Public Television, CBS "Criminal Minds" episodes and "Fox NFL Sunday" broadcast.

Discography

Studio albums

Singles

Music videos

References

External links
Official website

1964 births
Living people
People from Statesville, North Carolina
American country singer-songwriters
Country musicians from North Carolina
Show Dog-Universal Music artists
Singer-songwriters from North Carolina
People from Coon Rapids, Minnesota
Singer-songwriters from Minnesota